The 2014–15 Arkansas–Little Rock Trojans men's basketball team represented the University of Arkansas at Little Rock during the 2014–15 NCAA Division I men's basketball season. The Trojans, led by twelfth year head coach Steve Shields, played their home games at the Jack Stephens Center, and were members of the Sun Belt Conference. They finished the season 13–18, 8–12 in Sun Belt play to finish in eighth place. They lost in the first round of the Sun Belt tournament to South Alabama.

On March 18, 2015  head coach Steve Shields was fired. He compiled a record of 192–178 in eight seasons. In early April, the school hired Chris Beard as head coach.

Roster

Schedule

 
|-
!colspan=9 style="background:#800000; color:#c4c8cb;"| Regular season

|-
!colspan=9 style="background:#800000; color:#c4c8cb;"| Sun Belt tournament

References

Arkansas-Little Rock
Little Rock Trojans men's basketball seasons
TRoj
TRoj